Gorgin Darreh (also Romanized as Gorgīn Darreh; also known as Gorgīn Dar, Gūr-e Qar, and Gur-i-Ghar) is a village in Gavrud Rural District, in the Central District of Sonqor County, Kermanshah Province, Iran. At the 2006 census, its population was 126, in 26 families.

References 

Populated places in Sonqor County